Pennsylvania Route 46 (PA 46) is a  state highway located in northern Pennsylvania. The southern terminus of the route is at PA 120 in Emporium. The northern terminus is at the Bradford Bypass, carrying U.S. Route 219 (US 219) and PA 346, in Bradford, roughly two miles south of the New York-Pennsylvania border.

History

PA 46 was first signed in 1927, extending from U.S. Route 6 in Smethport north to US 219 in Bradford. The route was extended southward to Emporium in 1928 when the eastern segment of Pennsylvania Route 47, which ran along present-day PA 46 from PA 120 in Emporium to US 6 in Smethport, was decommissioned after only one year of service.

Major intersections

PA 46 Truck

Pennsylvania Route 46 Truck is a truck route that bypasses a weight-restricted bridge over the Pidgeon Hollow Run in Norwich Township, McKean County, Pennsylvania.  The route follows US 6, PA 155 and PA 120. It was signed in 2013. The bridge was completely reconstructed in 2017, but the route is still signed as of May 2022.

See also

References

External links

Pennsylvania Highways: PA 46

046
Transportation in Cameron County, Pennsylvania
Transportation in McKean County, Pennsylvania